The Tomb of Chang Yuchun is the tomb of Chang Yuchun (1330–1369), a military general in late Yuan and early Ming dynasties. The tomb dates from 1369, and is located on Purple Mountain in Nanjing. There are stone horses, stone tigers, stone sheep and stone warriors in front of the tomb. It has been categorized as a "Major National Historical and Cultural Site in Jiangsu" by the State Council of China. In addition, the tomb was inscribed on the UNESCO World Heritage List in 2003 as an extension of the Imperial Tombs of the Ming and Qing Dynasties site, for its outstanding preservation and its contribution to the medieval history of China.

History
The tomb was built for Chang Yuchun, a military general in late Yuan and early Ming dynasties (1330–1369). The tomb is located on Purple Mountain, in Xuanwu District, Nanjing, Jiangsu.

In 1871, in the 11th year of Tongzhi period of Qing dynasty (1644–1911), Chang's descendants renovated and refurbished his tomb.

In May 2006, it was listed among the batch of "Major National Historical and Cultural Sites in Jiangsu" by the State Council of China.

Gallery

References

Buildings and structures in Nanjing
Buildings and structures completed in 1369
Tourist attractions in Nanjing
1360s in Asia
Major National Historical and Cultural Sites in Jiangsu
14th century in China